Jesse James (born September 16, 1971) is a former American football center. He played 2 games for the St. Louis Rams in 1995-1996.

References 

1971 births
Living people
Sportspeople from Mobile, Alabama
Players of American football from Alabama
American football centers
Mississippi State Bulldogs football players
St. Louis Rams players